Arthur Blanch is an Australian country singer-songwriter. He is the father of country music singer, Jewel Blanch, with whom he has performed.

Career
In 1958, Arthur and Berice gave birth to daughter Jewel Blanch.

In 1962 The Blanch Family were signed to W&G label in Melbourne.

At the 1982 CMAA, Arthur and Jewel won Album of the Year for The Lady and the Cowboy.

In 2001, Arthur was inducted into the Australian Roll of Renown.

Discography

Albums

Awards

Australian Roll of Renown
The Australian Roll of Renown honours Australian and New Zealander musicians who have shaped the music industry by making a significant and lasting contribution to Country Music. It was inaugurated in 1976 and the inductee is announced at the Country Music Awards of Australia in Tamworth in January.

|-
| 2001
| Arthur Blanch
| Australian Roll of Renown
|

Country Music Awards of Australia
The Country Music Awards of Australia (CMAA) (also known as the Golden Guitar Awards) is an annual awards night held in January during the Tamworth Country Music Festival, celebrating recording excellence in the Australian country music industry. They have been held annually since 1973.
 (wins only)
|-
| 1982
| The Lady and the Cowboy (with Jewel Blanch)
| Album of the Year
| 
|-
| 1983
| Too Late For Regrets
| Album of the Year
| 
|-
| 1984
| "I've Come a Long Way"
| Male Vocalist of the Year
| 
|-
| 1985
| "What Do Lonely People Do"
| Male Vocalist of the Year
| 
|-

Tamworth Songwriters Awards
The Tamworth Songwriters Association (TSA) is an annual songwriting contest for original country songs, awarded in January at the Tamworth Country Music Festival. They commenced in 1986.
 (wins only)
|-
| 2007
| Arthur Blanch
| Songmaker Award
| 
|-

References

Living people
Australian male singers
Australian musicians
Australian singer-songwriters
Year of birth missing (living people)